Amber Lee Connors (born April 9, 1991) is an American voice actress, ADR Director , and line producer who has provided voices for English dubbed Japanese anime and video games. She is known for her roles as Nozomi Kaminashi from Keijo!!!!!!!!, Miki Kawai from A Silent Voice, Takami Karibuchi from Brave Witches, Juri Yukawa from Kokkoku: Moment by Moment, Esther Rosenthal from A Certain Scientific Accelerator, Yuri Shiraki from Lord of Vermilion: The Crimson King, Mai Kawakami from Myriad Colors Phantom World, Akagi from Azur Lane, Ooi from Kancolle, Ayano Hanasaki from Hanebado!, Pieck from Attack on Titan, Megakaryocyte from Cells at Work! and Mei Aihara from Citrus. Connors is also the founder of post-production company Sound Cadence Studios.

Filmography

Anime

Film

Animation

Video games

Sound Cadence Studios
Founded in 2013, Connors founded Sound Cadence Studios LLC, an American dubbing and post-production studio that specializes in anime dubs for Discotek Media and Crunchyroll (formerly Funimation). The studio is headquartered in Addison, Texas and on June 19, 2022, Sound Cadence opened a new studio based in Los Angeles.

Works

Anime
Actors: Songs Connection (Crunchyroll)
A Couple of Cuckoos (Crunchyroll)
Bananya and the Curious Bunch (Crunchyroll/Discotek Media)
Kemono Friends (Discotek Media)
Tribe Nine (Crunchyroll)

References

External links
 
 
 
 

21st-century American actresses
Actresses from Cleveland
Actresses from Dallas
Actresses from Los Angeles
American people of Irish descent
American voice actresses
American video game actresses
American women screenwriters
Living people
Baldwin Wallace University alumni
Cuyahoga Community College alumni
People from Los Angeles
Writers from Cleveland
Writers from Dallas
American voice directors
1991 births
Screenwriters from Ohio
Screenwriters from Texas